

Maximilian Harden (born Felix Ernst Witkowski, 20 October 1861 – 30 October 1927) was an influential German journalist and editor.

Biography
Born the son of a Jewish merchant in Berlin he attended the Französisches Gymnasium until he began to train as an actor and joined a traveling theatre troupe. In 1878 Harden converted to Protestantism and started his journalistic career as a theatre critic in 1884. He also published political essays under the pseudonym Apostata in several liberal newspapers like the Berliner Tageblatt edited by Rudolf Mosse.

From 1892 Harden published the journal Die Zukunft (The Future)  in Berlin. His baroque style was mocked by former friend Karl Kraus, who wrote a satire about "translations from Harden".

Initially a monarchist, Harden became a fierce critic of Kaiser Wilhelm II and his entourage including Philipp, Prince of Eulenburg, and General Kuno von Moltke. His public accusations of homosexual behaviour – according to Paragraph 175 a criminal offence at that time – from 1906 on led to numerous trials and did sustained damage to the reputation of the ruling House of Hohenzollern and the German jurisdiction. In reaction Karl Kraus, disgusted by the public display of intimate details, wrote an obituary: Maximilian Harden. Eine Erledigung (A Settlement).

By 1914, Harden had again moved sufficiently to the right that he welcomed the German invasion of Belgium. During the war, Harden was an annexationist who wrote numerous articles demanding that Germany win the war to annex most of Europe, Africa and Asia to make the Reich the world's greatest power. However, after the war he became a pacifist and supported the Weimar Republic. In 1921, he devoted two issues of Die Zukunft to covering the assassination of Talat Pasha and subsequent trial of the assassin, harshly criticizing Germany's failure to take action against the Armenian genocide.

In the following years Harden's readership diminished. On 3 July 1922, a few days after the assassination of Walther Rathenau, he was severely injured in an assault conducted by Freikorps members. In the following trial the court ruled that his writings had provoked the two assailants, Bert Weichardt and Albert Wilhelm Grenz. Both were charged and sentenced to two years and five months, and four years, respectively.

Harden abandoned the publishing of Die Zukunft and in 1923 retired to Montana, Switzerland, where he died four years later. His grave is located in Berlin at the Friedhof Heerstraße (Feld 8-C-10 (Reg. 335) (Ehrengrab)). The British historian A. J. P. Taylor wrote: Harden was certainly the most brilliant political writer during the reign of Wilhelm II. His paper, Die Zukunft, had a unique influence despite its small circulation. But Harden's spirit was essential critical and destructive. He always took up men when they were down-Bismarck after his fall and Holstein after his resignation. Equally he denounced those were up-Wilhelm II when in power, and even Ebert. His outstanding achievement was to hound Eulenburg from public life-not much to be really proud of. In international affairs, he swung from one extreme to another: at one time a Big Navy man, later an advocate of a naval agreement. At the beginning of the First World War he was a violent annexationist, towards its end a Wilsonian democrat and internationalist. He remained constant only in his high opinion of himself and contempt for everybody else.

See also 
 Harden–Eulenburg Affair

References

Further reading 
 Norman Domeier: The Eulenburg Affair. A Cultural History of Politics in Imperial Germany (German History in Context 1), New York 2015, .

External links 

 Maximilian Harden, Krieg und Friede, Berlin: Erich Reiss, 1918.
 "The Controversy of Zion", Geoffrey Wheatcroft, 1996, ; pp. 203–4 deal with Harden
 

Journalists from Berlin
German male journalists
19th-century German journalists
19th-century German male writers
20th-century German journalists
German people of Jewish descent
Converts to Lutheranism from Judaism
1861 births
1927 deaths
Lutheran pacifists
Jewish German writers
Französisches Gymnasium Berlin alumni
German newspaper founders
German newspaper publishers (people)